is a private university in Toyohira-ku, Sapporo, Hokkaido, Japan. It was originally set up in 1977 as the Commerce Faculty of the Kitami campus of Hokkai Gakuen University; it was spun off as a separate university in April 2006, at which point it moved to Sapporo. The school has exchange student agreements with Shandong University and Yantai University in China, Daejeon University in South Korea, and the University of Lethbridge in Canada.

Notable students and faculty
 Shunpei Mizuno, author, lecturer in Korean language

References

External links
Official website 

Educational institutions established in 2006
Private universities and colleges in Japan
Hokkai School of Commerce
Toyohira-ku, Sapporo
2006 establishments in Japan
Universities and colleges in Hokkaido